Hite or HITE may refer to:

HiteJinro, a South Korean brewery
Hite Brewery
Hite (surname)
Hite, California, former name of Hite Cove, California
Hite, Utah, a ghost town
HITE, an industrial estate in Pakistan

See also
Hite v. Fairfax, Virginia Supreme Court case